The fallfish (Semotilus corporalis) is a North American freshwater fish, a chub in the family Cyprinidae. The fallfish is the largest minnow species native to Eastern North America.

Description
Juvenile fallfish have a dark stripe that runs down the center of their body. They are a silvery shade on the top and sides of the body, but have a white shading on the belly. Breeding males develop a pinkish tone on the opercular region, although the species does not develop bright breeding colors. Spawning males build stone nests, known as a redd, which form a prominent part of the bottom on many streams throughout the northeast. Spawning is communal with both males and females joining the nest builder.

Distribution and habitat
Fallfish are found in the northeastern United States and eastern Canada, where they inhabit clear streams, lakes, and ponds. They predominantly prefer swift currents, however, they can also be found in well oxygenated pools. As their name suggests they are often found at the base of waterfalls. Before the introduction of fish such as smallmouth bass, largemouth bass, and brown trout, the fallfish was the apex predator in many streams.

Diet and predation 
Juvenile and young fallfish primarily consume chironomids and zooplankton. Once they reach 100mm their diet transitions to small fish (including their own young) and prey of opportunity such as fish eggs and terrestrial insects. There is little overlap between the diets of juvenile and adult fallfish.

Angling 
Fallfish are often encountered when fishing for more desirable species, but their large size, dogged fighting style, powerful runs on light tackle, and willingness to strike make them a worthy quarry in their own right. They will readily take bait, lures, and flies, and have been known to strike lures almost as large as themselves. 

The record was tied on May 6, 2022 by angler Josh D. Dolin while fishing the Cowpasture River near Williamsville, Virginia. Previous records come from New Hampshire and Pennsylvania.

References

External links 
Smith, L. C. The Inland Fishes of New York State. New York: The New York State Department of Environmental Conservation. 1985, pp. 155, 156

Semotilus
Fish described in 1817

Freshwater fish of North America